The Battle of Pease Bottom, also called the Battle of the Bighorn River was a conflict between the United States Army and the Sioux on August 11, 1873 along the Yellowstone River opposite the mouth of the Bighorn River near present-day Custer, Montana. The main combatants were units of the 7th U.S. Cavalry under Lieutenant Colonel George Armstrong Custer, and Native Americans from the village of the Hunkpapa medicine man, Sitting Bull, many of whom would clash with Custer again approximately three years later at the Battle of the Little Big Horn in the Crow Indian Reservation.

Short history of the battlefield 

The site of the future battlefield came to be a locality in a treaty territory for the first time in 1851. The Treaty of Fort Laramie describes the area as Crow Indian country. The Lakota tribe acknowledged this. Nearly all the battles in the mid-1860s and the 1870s "between the army and the Dakota Lakota, North Dakota were on lands those Indians had taken from other tribes since 1851." When the Crows agreed to settle on a smaller reservation on May 7, 1868, all the 1851 Crow treaty land north of the Yellowstone - including the future Pease Bottom - became U.S. territory.

Participants

U.S. Army forces 
Custer and ten companies of the 7th Cavalry were part of the Yellowstone Expedition of 1873, a military column commanded by Colonel David S. Stanley accompanying the Northern Pacific Railway survey party surveying the north side of the Yellowstone River west of the Powder River in eastern Montana. Stanley's column consisted of a 1,300 man force of cavalry, infantry, and two artillery pieces (3" ordnance rifles). It traveled with 275 mule-drawn wagons and 353 civilians involved in the survey. Twenty-seven Indian and mixed-blood scouts supported the column.

Just a week before, the army had been under Lakota attack in U.S. territory at Honsinger Bluff.

The Battle of Pease Bottom was fought primarily by 8 companies of the 7th Cavalry under command of General Custer, numbering roughly 450 men.

Native American forces 
The Native American forces were from the Sitting Bull's village, estimated at anywhere from 400 to 500 lodges. It included Hunkpapa Sioux under Gall accompanied by the warchief Rain in the Face, Oglala Sioux under Crazy Horse, and Miniconjou and Cheyenne. The warrior force was estimated at between 800 and 1000 warriors.

Battle 

On the morning of August 11, 1873, Custer was encamped with a portion of the 1873 Yellowstone Expedition (Eight companies of the 7th Cavalry) along the north side of the Yellowstone River at what was later known as Pease Bottom near present-day Custer, Montana. In the early morning hours warriors from the village of Sitting Bull started firing at Custer's camp from across the river, and by dawn skirmishing had broken out in several locations. After shooting at least 3 warriors across the river, Private John Tuttle of Company E, 7th Cavalry was killed in the morning fighting, warriors then crossed the Yellowstone River above and below the camp of the 7th Cavalry and attacked Custer's troops. The 7th Cavalry successfully defended their rear, front and center from this attack, then counter-attacked with a charge, breaking the warrior positions and driving the warriors eight or more miles from the battlefield. At about the same time, Colonel Stanley's column appeared in the distance several miles away and hurried to support the engagement. During the battle Second Lieutenant Charles Braden of the 7th Cavalry was critically wounded, along with three other Privates of the same regiment. Braden's thigh was shattered by an Indian bullet and he remained on permanent sick leave until his retirement from the Army in 1878. He would posthumously be awarded the Distinguished Service Cross in 1925 for his actions during the battle. At least one army horse was wounded during the engagement. Indian losses were unknown, however, estimates from Custer's post-battle report claim "their losses in killed and wounded were beyond all proportion to that which they were enabled to inflict on us, our losses being one officer badly wounded, four men killed, and three wounded. Careful investigation justifies the statement that including both day's battles, the Indian losses will number forty warriors, while their wounded on the opposite bank of the river may increase this number."

Order of battle

United States Army 
United States Army, Lieutenant Colonel George A. Custer, 7th United States Cavalry Regiment, Commanding.
 7th U. S. Cavalry, Companies A, B, C, E, F, G, H, K, L and M: Lieutenant Colonel George A. Custer
 Artillery Section of (two) 3-inch ordnance rifles (Cannons): Second Lieutenant John McA. Webster, 22nd Infantry

Native Americans 
 Lakota Sioux: Sitting Bull.

See also
Sitting Bull
George Armstrong Custer

References

Further reading
 Colonel Stanley's and Lieutenant Colonel Custer's Expedition on the Yellowstone, 1873.
 Lubetkin, M. John, Jay Cooke's Gamble: The Northern Pacific Railroad, The Sioux, and the Panic of 1873, University of Oklahoma Press, Norman, Oklahoma 2006 

Conflicts in 1873
Battles involving the Sioux
Battles involving the United States
Battle of Pease Bottom
Wars between the United States and Native Americans
Battle of Pease Bottom
Indian wars of the American Old West
1873 in Montana Territory
August 1873 events
1870s battles